Upper Coomera State College (UCSC), established in 2003, is a state school situated in the developing Coomera area in Gold Coast, Queensland, Australia. It is operated by Education Queensland. As of 2007, the school has grades Prep through 12. The college is divided into 3 sub schools: Chisholm Junior School, Jakaara Middle School and Fensham Senior School. The school is the temporary site of a Gold Coast City Council Library until one is built at the Coomera Town Centre. At construction stage 2 (of 3 or 4 stages) in 2007, this school was expanding with a projected 3,000 students by 2008. UCSC is built to blend into the developing surroundings that on average gains approximately one house every week.

As of 2019, the school has 1993 students enrolled; with 969 girls, 1024 boys, 104 indigenous students, and a enrolment continuation of 90%. The school has many promising STEM students. Most notably, Jazz Jeavons won the stem award for the school in 2016, truly a hard-working student.

The school offers various excellence programs. Creative Arts Academy, STEM Academy, and Sports Academy are all available at the college.

References and notes

External links
College Website

Schools on the Gold Coast, Queensland
Public high schools in Queensland
Educational institutions established in 2003
2003 establishments in Australia